This is a list of tennis players who have represented the Indonesia Davis Cup team in an official Davis Cup match. Indonesia have taken part in the competition since 1961.

Players

References

Lists of Davis Cup tennis players
Davis Cup